Gopal Rao, known by his stage name Dheerendra Gopal, was an Indian film and stage actor known for his work in Kannada films. After making his film debut with Subhadra Kalyana (1972), he received recognition for his performance in Puttanna Kanagal's Paduvaaralli Pandavaru (1978).

Career

Dheerendra Gopal was noticed at a young age by Gubbi Veeranna. Gubbi Veeranna saw him solo act at a school and was impressed with his performance and invited him to be part of his company. The young Gopal donned the main role in Yechchama Nayaka and never looked back thereafter. He later began acting in films. His first film appearance was in Naagarahaavu. Over the years, he acted in over 180 Kannada films and became popular for his role as politician-villain. He earned recognition from Puttanna Kanagal's film "Paduvarahalli Pandavaru". His other popular films were Subhadra Kalyana, Gajapathi Garvabhanga, Simha Jodi, Naga Kala Bhairava, Nanjundi Kalyana and Annaiah. Anjali Geethanjali was his last film.

He released over 300 political-satire dialogues on audio cassettes, that became popular.

He was a lover of theatre and acted in hundreds of plays.

Death
Dheerendra Gopal's health deteriorated in 1999 after a severe attack of jaundice. He died of a heart attack at his residence in Harihar on 25 December 2000. He was 59. He was survived by his wife Sunandamma, daughter Vidyavathi and two sons, Narendra Babu and Sudheendra. The funeral was held on Tuesday, 26 December 2000, at the Hindu Rudrabhoomi in Harihar.

Partial filmography

 Subhadra Kalyana (1972)
 Naagarahaavu (1972)
 Paduvarahalli Pandavaru (1978)
 Nanobba Kalla (1979)...Satish
 Sahasa Simha (1982)...Ratanlal
 Aahuti (1985)
 Nanjundi Kalyana (1989)
 Gajapathi Garvabhanga (1989)
 Bombat Hendthi (1992)
 Banni Ondsala Nodi (1992)
 Sriramachandra (1992)
 Rupayi Raja (1992)
 Annaiah (1993)
 Mana Mecchida Sose (1992)
 Gadibidi Ganda (1993)
 Putnanja (1995)
 Simhada Mari (1997)
 Yamalokadalli Veerappan (1998)
 Mari Kannu Hori Myage (1998)...Annaiah
 Anjali Geethanjali (2001)

Awards
Dheerendra Gopal was a recipient of the Karnataka Nataka Academy Award and the Rajyotsava Award.

References

External links 
 

Male actors from Karnataka
2000 deaths
Male actors in Kannada cinema
Indian male film actors
20th-century Indian male actors
People from Davanagere district
1940 births